The Chimera Painter (also spelled Chimaera Painter) was an anonymous Corinthian black figure vase painter active c. 600-575 B.C. He is named for the Chimera depicted on one of his works, which is now in Vienna. The artist was likely a student of the Columbus Painter, who in turn was a student of the Painter of Palermo 489. His work displays strong Near Eastern influence; the influence of Assyrian art is particularly visible in his depictions of lions.

References

External links
 
 Plate with Seated Lioness on Google Arts and Culture
 Corinthian Round-Bodied Pyxis c. 570 B.C. attributed to the Chimera Painter. in the online catalog of the Getty Museum

Ancient Greek vase painters
Ancient Corinthians
Anonymous artists of antiquity